The Northern Biskopsgården Church is a church building in the northern parts of Biskopsgården on the island of Hisingen in Gothenburg, Sweden. Earlier belonging to the Lundby of the Church of Sweden, it was inaugurated in 1970 as a parish home, and taken out of use in 2004 before being transferred to the Gothenburg Ecclesiastical Town Mission and the Finnish Parish.

References

1970 establishments in Sweden
20th-century Church of Sweden church buildings
Churches in Gothenburg
Churches completed in 1970
Churches in the Diocese of Gothenburg